Destutia is a genus of moths in the family Geometridae.

Species
 Destutia excelsa (Strecker, 1878)
 Destutia flumenata (Pearsall, 1906)
 Destutia novata Grossbeck, 1908
 Destutia oblentaria (Grote, 1883)

References
 Destutia at Markku Savela's Lepidoptera and Some Other Life Forms
 Natural History Museum Lepidoptera genus database

Ourapterygini
Moth genera